The Ministry for Internal Affairs of Kalmykia (Министерство внутренних дел по Республике Калмыкия) is the official name of Kalmykia's police. It is subordinate directly to the Russian Interior Ministry and the President of Kalmykia.

The current minister is Baatr Alexandrovich Gindeyev (since July 26, 2011). The headquarters is in Elista City.

Structure
Investigations (Следственный отдел, СО)
Traffic police (Отдел Государственной инспекции безопасности дорожного движения, ОГИБДД)
Anti-terrorism center (Центр по противодействию экстремизму, ЦПЭ)
 Operations (Оперативно – разыскная часть собственной безопасности, ОРЧ СБ)
 Detective directorate (Управление уголовного розыска, УУР)
 Anticorruption and economic security directorate (Управление экономической безопасности и противодействия коррупции (УЭБ и ПК)
Witness protection department (Оперативно-разыскная часть по обеспечению безопасности лиц, подлежащих государственной защите, ОРЧ ОГЗ)
OMON (Отряд мобильный особого назначения, ОМОН)
SOBR (Специальный отряд быстрого реагирования, СОБР)
Information (Информационный центр, ИЦ)

External links
 Official Website
 Traffic Police of Kalmykia

Politics of Kalmykia
Kalmykia
Kalmykia